Alimbetovka, also known as Alimbet (Älımbet, الىمبەت; , Alimbetovka) is a town in Aktobe Region, west Kazakhstan. It lies just a few kilometres from the Russian border.

References

Aktobe Region
Cities and towns in Kazakhstan